Heinz Stücke (born 11 January 1940) is a long-distance itinerant cyclist from Hövelhof, North Rhine-Westphalia, Germany  — noted for setting the world record for bicycle touring in 1995.

In a global journey spanning more than 50 years, Stücke has travelled over six hundred thousand kilometres by bicycle.

Global bicycle tour
In November 1962, the 22-year-old Stücke quit his job as a tool and die maker, and rode out of his hometown on a three-speed bicycle, with a plan to see the world. He says that his extraordinary desire to travel was partly motivated by his aversion to returning to factory work.

In the early 1980s, after two decades on the road, Stücke decided to attempt to visit every country in the world. He believed he had accomplished his goal when he reached Seychelles in 1996, but to him it felt anticlimactic. He had spent too little time in some countries, and there was still much to experience; so he continued on. From 1995 through 1999, the Guinness Book of Records described him as having travelled more widely by bicycle than anyone in history.

During his travels, he has encountered many hazards and suffered numerous injuries:

 In the Atacama Desert of Chile he was hit by a truck.
 In Haiti he was chased by an angry mob.
 In Egypt he was beaten unconscious by soldiers.
 In Cameroon he was detained by the military for "slandering the state".
 In Alaska he got into a car accident, ending up in a freezing river.
 In the United States he was abandoned by an automobile driver who stole all of his supplies after offering him a ride.
 In Indonesia, 1974, he suffered a serious bout of dysentery.
 In Zambia, 1980, he was shot in the big toe when surrounded by four of Nkomos "Freedom Fighters".
 In Mozambique, 1995, he was attacked by bees while bathing in a river.
 In Siberia, 1997, his bicycle was stolen for the fifth time, along with his luggage (all of which was recovered).
 In England, 2006, his bicycle—the same machine he rode from Hövelhof in 1962—was stolen again, this time from his campsite in Portsmouth. (The bicycle was recovered the following day in a local park.)

Although he has ridden the same steel-framed bicycle on most of his journeys, in 2002 he rode across Canada with a partner on a Hase Pino tandem recumbent bicycle, which Hase Spezialräder built and sponsored.

Recording the journey

Since 1962, Stücke has taken more than 100,000 photographs. He funds his expeditions with licensing revenue from his photo catalogue; donations; and sales of his travel writing, postcards, and booklets that feature his photographs, writing, and illustrations.

In 1995, around the time he set the world record for bicycle touring, Stücke self-published a memoir: Mit dem Fahrrad um die Welt ("Cycling Around the World"). In 2015, Dutch travel writer Eric van den Berg published a biography commemorating Stücke's career of international bicycle touring—a career which by then had continued for more than 50 years. The book, Home Is Elsewhere: 50 Years Around the World by Bike, also features Stücke's photographs.

Spanish filmmaker Albert Albacete's documentary film The Man Who Wanted to See It All explores Stücke's life, motivations, philosophy, and legacy; there also are plans to build a museum devoted to Stücke in his hometown of Hövelhof.

References

External links

 
 
 
 
 

1940 births
German male cyclists
Living people
People from Paderborn (district)
Male touring cyclists
Ultra-distance cyclists
Cycling writers
Photographers from North Rhine-Westphalia
German travel writers
German male non-fiction writers
Cyclists from North Rhine-Westphalia